Sericanthe is a genus of flowering plants in the family Rubiaceae. It is found in tropical and subtropical Africa. The genus was described by Elmar Robbrecht in 1978 based on the species in Neorosea, except for the type species, Neorosea jasminiflora, which went to Tricalysia. Bacterial leaf nodules are found in most of the species and the endophytic bacteria have been identified as Burkholderia.

Species

Sericanthe adamii 
Sericanthe andongensis 
Sericanthe auriculata 
Sericanthe burundensis 
Sericanthe chevalieri 
Sericanthe chimanimaniensis 
Sericanthe gabonensis 
Sericanthe halleana 
Sericanthe jacfelicis 
Sericanthe leonardii 
Sericanthe lowryana 
Sericanthe mpassa 
Sericanthe odoratissima 
Sericanthe pellegrinii 
Sericanthe petitii 
Sericanthe rabia 
Sericanthe raynaliorum 
Sericanthe roseoides 
Sericanthe suffruticosa 
Sericanthe testui 
Sericanthe toupetou 
Sericanthe trilocularis

References

 
Rubiaceae genera
Taxonomy articles created by Polbot